Events in the year 2023 in Monaco.

Incumbents 
 Monarch: Albert II
 Minister of State (Monaco): Pierre Dartout

Events 
Ongoing – COVID-19 pandemic in Monaco

5 February: 2023 Monegasque general election

See also 
 COVID-19 pandemic in Europe
 City states

References 

 
2020s in Monaco
Years of the 21st century in Monaco
Monaco
Monaco